Bluesanct Records is an independent record label located in Bloomington, Indiana and run by Michael (Mkl) Anderson, who records experimental music for the label under the Drekka moniker. Other artists include Elephant Micah, Vollmar, and Caethua. Alumni include Low, Rivulets, Static Films, and The Iditarod.

See also
 List of record labels

External links
 Official site
Michael Anderson (Drekka) interview (january 2001) for QRD

American record labels
Indie rock record labels